Firmino Baleizão da Graça Sardinha, (born 10 September 1945 in Beja, Portugal), known as Osvaldinho, is a former Portuguese footballer who played as defender for Desportivo Beja, Vitória Guimarães, Boavista F.C., Benfica de São Tomé e Príncipe, Marítimo and Gil Vicente. Osvaldinho played 2 caps for the Portugal national team.

External links 
 

1945 births
Living people
People from Beja, Portugal
C.D. Beja players
Vitória S.C. players
Boavista F.C. players
C.S. Marítimo players
Gil Vicente F.C. players
Portugal international footballers
Portuguese footballers
Primeira Liga players
Association football defenders
Sportspeople from Beja District